Edward Hamlin may refer to:

 Edward Hamlin (fiction writer) (born 1959), American writer and composer
 Edward S. Hamlin (1808–1894), American politician from Ohio